This is the list of Schedule III drugs as defined by the United States Controlled Substances Act at  and , with modifications through August 22, 2014. The following findings are required for drugs to be placed in this schedule:
 The drug or other substance has a potential for abuse less than the drugs or other substances in schedules I and II.
 The drug or other substance has a currently accepted medical use in treatment in the United States.
 Abuse of the drug or other substance may lead to moderate or low physical dependence or high psychological dependence.

The complete list of Schedule III drugs follows. The Administrative Controlled Substances Code Number for each drug is included.

Stimulants

Depressants

Others

Narcotics

Steroids

Hallucinogens

References

Controlled Substances Act
Drug-related lists